Madhira Assembly Constituency is a scheduled caste reserved constituency of Telangana Legislative Assembly, India. It is one among 10 constituencies in Khammam district. Madhira is a place in Khammam District. It comes unders Khammam Lok Sabha Constituency.

Mallu Bhatti Vikramarka, current deputy Floor Leader of Indian National Congress in Telangana Legislative Assembly is representing the constituency for the second time.

Mandals
The Assembly Constituency presently comprises the following Mandals:

Members of Legislative Assembly

Election results

Telangana Legislative Assembly election, 2018

Telangana Legislative Assembly election, 2014

See also
 List of constituencies of Telangana Legislative Assembly

References

Assembly constituencies of Telangana
Khammam district